A giant, week long tornado outbreak sequence of 73 tornadoes occurred on May 3–9, 1961, impacting areas from Utah to the East Coast of the United States. Overall, the outbreak sequence caused 23 fatalities, 126 injuries, and $42.205 million in damages (1961 USD).

Meteorological synopsis
Multiple weather systems impacted mostly the Great Plains and Midwest, bringing multiple rounds of severe weather and tornadoes throughout the region starting on May 3 and ending on May 9. Other weather systems also produced tornadoes in Florida and Utah.

Confirmed tornadoes

May 3 event

May 4 event

May 5 event

May 6 event

May 7 event

May 8 event

May 9 event

St. Petersburg, Florida

A westward-moving waterspout crossing over Tampa Bay made landfall on the north side of St. Petersburg, causing severe damage to multiple buildings. Two homes were unroofed, including one where the TV antenna was bent and dropped on a car. Although there were no casualties, the tornado left behind $25,000 in damage.

Southeastern Talihina–Reichert–Glendale–Howe, Oklahoma

This violent, catastrophic F4 tornado first touched down southeast of Talihina, where an outbuilding on a farmstead was destroyed. It then moved through  of forest in rural areas of Le Flore County, Oklahoma as it crossed over the Winding Stair Mountains, although there is a possibility that the tornado lifted and a new tornado formed. As it came down Brushy Mountain, it became violent and slammed into Reichert, obliterating almost everything in its path. It then crossed the Yellow Spring Ridge and Potts Mountain and moved into Glendale, causing more destruction. The still violent tornado then obliterated more buildings and homes in the town of Howe. Afterwards, it weakened before dissipating.

At least 70 homes were damaged or destroyed. It caused the most casualties during the outbreak, with 16 deaths and 58 injuries.

Witmer Lake–Hamilton Lake, Indiana/Edon, Ohio

A large, long-tracked F3 tornado–which was likely a tornado family–first touched down on the north shore of Witmer Lake in LaGrange County, Indiana. It moved due east and immediately became strong as it moved into Witmer Manor and Webers Landing. A total of 22 cottages were destroyed or badly damaged while 30 others sustained minor damage. All five injuries from the tornado occurred here before the tornado passed north of Wolcottville. From there, the tornado weakened and skipped along a non-continuous damage path. Scores of homes and barns were damaged as the tornado passed over Blackman Lake, Northern South Milford, Woodland Park, Big Long Lake, Shady Nook, Gravel Beach, Timberhurst, and Taylor Lake. Damages in LaGrange County totaled $2.5 million.

The tornado then crossed into Steuben County, continuing to skip and damage homes and barns as it moved through Turkey Creek and passed north of Hudson and Ashley. As it approached Forest Park north of Hamilton it touched down solidly again and intensified. It then struck Forest Park before crossing Hamilton Lake and striking Oakwood and Circle Park. Two cottages were destroyed, several more were unroofed, and a car with four occupants was thrown in Hamilton Lake, although none of these events resulted in any casualties. It then moved back into rural areas before crossing into Ohio. Damages in Steuben County reached $2.5 million.

In Williams County, Ohio, the tornado turned northeastward, passing through the northwest side of Edon. Damage here was severe as multiple farmhouses and barns were demolished or extensively damaged. After passing Edon, the tornado quickly weakened and dissipated. Losses in Ohio totaled $25,000.

Five people were injured.

Bruno–Western Yellville–Summit, Arkansas

A tornado formed on the south side of Bruno and passed east of town as it meandered northeast. It moved over rugged, rural terrain for a while before growing tremendously as it approached Yellville. It intensified before crossing over Crooked Creek into western side of the town, causing major damage to the area. Widespread F3 damage was observed in this area as extensive damage was inflicted to homes, buildings, and trees and all the casualties from the storm occurred here. Timber along the path was also damaged by the tornado. After moving out of Summit, the tornado quickly narrowed and weakened and dissipated in a rural area north of town.

It destroyed 30 buildings and damaged 50 others along its path. Three people were killed and nine (possibly 12) others were injured. Heavy rainfall from the storm also damaged crops and roadways as well.

Hand Valley–Clarkridge, Arkansas/Southern Udall–South Fork, Missouri

This slow-moving, long-tracked, large, multi-vortex F3 tornado first touched down in Hand Valley, Arkansas and moved northeastward over the Crooked Creek and White River. It then passed east of Gassville before moving into Colfax, causing heavy damage. It did more damage as it passed through the west side of Mountain Home before moving back into rural areas. It crossed over Walker Creek, Pigeon Creek, and East Pigeon Creek, before reaching its peak intensity as it tore into Clarkridge. A church, a store, and two homes were destroyed before the tornado moved into Missouri. Throughout Arkansas, the tornado damaged 50 other buildings, injured one, and caused $2.5 million in damage.

The tornado then moved into Missouri and turned northeastward, heavily damaging multiple farm homes and buildings as it crossed over the Norfolk Lake and passed through the south side of Udall. It then moved through mostly rural areas before striking Egypt Grove and Hocomo, causing additional heavy damage, although it was beginning to weaken by this time. The tornado caused some additional damage before dissipating just within the city limits of South Fork. Throughout Missouri, nine people were injured, and damage was estimated at $1 million.

A total of 10 people were injured. Rainfall from the storm also damaged field crops in Arkansas.

Madisonville–Bremen–Beaver Dam–Peth, Kentucky

This long-tracked, large F3 tornado touched down just west of Madisonville and immediately reached its peak intensity as it moved east-northeast into downtown. Multiple buildings and homes were extensively damaged, including a three-story brick building that lost its top two floors and two two-story brick buildings that had extensive damage. Trees and power lines were downed, an airplane was destroyed at the Madisonville Municipal Airport in nearby Anton, and cars were damaged by flying debris. All three injuries from this tornado occurred near or in town and losses totaled $2.5 million alone. From Madisonville, the tornado weakened and turned eastward, causing lesser, but still considerable damage as it hit Northern Millport as well as the towns of Bremen Station and Bremen. From there, it began to skip as it hit the town of Moorman, unroofing the Moorman High School gym and destroying a small home. Damage was also observed in Centertown, Beaver Dam, Mt. Pleasant, Arnold, Dogwalk, and Neafus before the tornado finally dissipating in Peth.

Three people were injured and losses totaled $15 million. Despite the heavy damage, tornado researcher Thomas P. Grazulis gave the tornado an F2 rating. It is also possible that the tornado started in McLean County while never crossing into Grayson County.

Southern Fairmount, Kansas/Waldron–Weatherby Lake–Northern Liberty, Missouri

This violent, multi-vortex F4 tornado first touched down north-northwest of Basehor, Kansas on the south side of Fairmount. It moved east-northeast and quickly intensified as neared the Missouri River, turning east-southeast and then east north of Wolcott. About 40-50 homes were damaged and a car was thrown  over a  grove of trees before landing upside down on railroad tracks, injuring the three women inside. Nine other injuries occurred over this part of the track as well and damage in Kansas reached $10 million.

The tornado then crossed the Missouri River into Missouri, striking the town Waldron before striking Weatherby Lake and Barry, where more damage occurred. The tornado continued to cause damage as it moved through Extreme Northern Kansas City as well as the north side of Liberty before dissipating. Damage in Missouri totaled $750,000.

There were 12 injuries (one source list 11), and $10.75 million in damage.

Liberty–Bradley, New York

A strong F2 tornado touched down in Liberty and skipped east-northeast. Multiple vacation resorts were heavily damaged in five or six areas, including three of them that were almost completely destroyed. The tornado passed through Bradley before dissipating over the Neversink Reservoir southwest of Neversink. A total of 50 structures were damaged and four (possibly only three) people suffered minor injuries, which were mainly from shock.

Non-tornadic impacts
Numerous reports of large hail and wind damage were confirmed throughout the event. The biggest hailstone was recorded as being  in diameter and was recorded twice in both Texas and Oklahoma as well as once in Kansas. On May 6, the strongest winds were recorded in Tupelo, Mississippi, where  gusts destroyed a plane and damaged several others at an airport. On May 5, severe thunderstorm winds in Nebraska City, Nebraska destroyed an airplane hangar and tossed the plane inside into the trees nearby. In addition to the numerous tornadoes that occurred, one waterspout was confirmed to have taken place near Key West, Florida on May 9.

See also
 List of North American tornadoes and tornado outbreaks

Notes

References

Tornadoes of 1961
F4 tornadoes
Tornado outbreaks by intensity
Weather events in North America
Tornadoes in Oklahoma
Tornadoes in Texas
Tornadoes in Utah
Tornadoes in Colorado
Tornadoes in Florida
Tornadoes in Arkansas
Tornadoes in Missouri
Tornadoes in Indiana
Tornadoes in Kansas
Tornadoes in Ohio
Tornadoes in Kentucky
Tornadoes in Tennessee
Tornadoes in Georgia (U.S. state)
Tornadoes in New York (state)